Novochelatkanovo (Yañı Sılatqan) is a rural locality (a village) in Chuvash-Karamalinsky Selsoviet, Aurgazinsky District, Bashkortostan, Russia. The population was 59 as of 2010. There are 3 streets.

Geography 
Novochelatkanovo is located 27 km southeast of Tolbazy (the district's administrative centre) by road. Potashevka is the nearest rural locality.

References 

Rural localities in Aurgazinsky District